Cerje is a village located in the municipality of Kraljevo, Serbia. According to the 2011 census, the village has a population of 537 inhabitants.

References

Populated places in Raška District